World at War: Stalingrad is a 1995 computer wargame developed by Atomic Games and published by Avalon Hill. It is the second game in the World at War series, following Operation Crusader.

Stalingrad was followed by D-Day: America Invades (1995).

Gameplay
World at War: Stalingrad simulates the battle of Stalingrad including several different scenarios up to the entire campaign.

Development
The game was released on Mac computers in November 1994.

Reception

World at War: Stalingrad sold fewer than 50,000 units globally. This was part of a trend for Avalon Hill games during the period; Terry Coleman of Computer Gaming World wrote in late 1998 that "no AH game in the past five years" had reached the mark.

In PC Gamer US, T. Liam McDonald called Stalingrad "as good as wargaming gets." The magazine's editors later nominated Stalingrad for their 1995 "Best Wargame" award, but ultimately gave the prize to Steel Panthers.

Czech magazine Score rated the game 8 out of 10.

Reviews
MikroBitti (Jun, 1995)

References

External links
World at War: Stalingrad

1995 video games
Atomic Games games
Avalon Hill video games
Classic Mac OS games
Computer wargames
DOS games
Video games developed in the United States
Video games set in the Soviet Union
Windows games
World War II video games